Herman Maximilien de Burlet (Rotterdam, 6 November 1883 – Königswinter, 1957), was a Dutch anatomist, embryologist, physiologist and pathologist.

1883 births
1957 deaths
Dutch physiologists
Dutch anatomists
20th-century Dutch anatomists
Dutch pathologists
Katyn massacre investigators